Hater is the debut studio album by the American rock band Hater. It was released in 1993 on A&M Records. 

The album was reissued on vinyl in 2016 by UME.

Production
The album was recorded live in five days, in a Seattle studio. Most of the material was written by Ben Shepherd, who switched from bass to guitar for the album.

Critical reception
The Stranger called the album "a concise ripper that revitalizes garage rock without descending into kitsch." Trouser Press called it "trivial and self-indulgent, unreleasable were it not for the stature of the participants."

Track listing
Songs composed by Ben Shepherd except where noted:
Mona Bone Jakon - 3:09 (Cat Stevens)
Who Do I Kill? - 2:37 (John McBain/Shepherd)
Tot Finder - 3:06 (McBain/Brian Wood)
Lion and Lamb - 2:29 (McBain)
Roadside - 2:23 (Shepherd/Wood)
Down Undershoe - 4:03 
Circles - 2:11
Putrid - 4:17 (Shepherd/Wood)
Blistered - 2:27 (Billy "Edd" Wheeler)
Sad McBain - 4:21 (Matthew "Matt" Cameron/McBain)

Personnel
Matt Cameron - vocals, drums
John McBain - guitar
Ben Shepherd - vocals, guitar
John Waterman - bass
Brian Wood - vocals

References

External links
 

Hater (band) albums
1993 albums
A&M Records albums